Phan Văn Bàn (born 1937) is a Vietnamese political dissident. He spent 29 years in jail in Vietnam, after the fall of Saigon.

Phan Van Ban was born in Tu An commune, Tu Nghia district, central Quang Ngai province. He was a former police officer of the pre-1975 South Vietnam regime in Dalat, was in charge of propaganda for the organisation that dropped anti-government documents and leaflets in the southern province of Ba Ria-Vung Tau. He has been in jail since 1978 and a People's Court sentenced him to life in prison in 1985, in Prison Camp Nam Ha in northern Vietnam.

"The release of Phan Van Ban is a welcome development," said Angela Aggeler, the press attache for the US embassy in Hanoi. "He's been held in prison for more than 20 years after calling for peaceful political change in Vietnam. We are pleased that Mr Ban will be able to join his family in the US."

The communist government has still to account for numerous religious and political prisoners remaining in prisons and  Human-rights groups said Vietnam has stepped up its crackdown on dissidents. More than a dozen pro-democracy activists have been arrested since November 2006. The United States last year placed Vietnam on a blacklist of "countries of particular concern" for abusing rights to worship.

Van Thanh, who was a political prisoner released from the Vietnamese communist camp on November 5, 1998, now living in France, revealed that there were at least 37 other political prisoners being held at Prison Camp Thanh Hoa Five and Prison Camp Nam Ha.

See also 

 Human rights after the fall of Saigon

External links 
 37 other Political Prisoners in Thanh Hoa and Nam Ha Prison Camps 
 Vietnam frees dissident, sends him to US, dpa German Press Agency
 Vietnam jails 3 pro-democracy activists, International Herald Tribune
 Vietnam Human Rights Journal

Living people
Victims of human rights abuses
Vietnamese dissidents
Political repression in Vietnam
Vietnamese democracy activists
1937 births
Prisoners sentenced to life imprisonment by Vietnam
Vietnamese prisoners sentenced to life imprisonment